Alpha Reticuli, Latinized from α Reticuli, is the Bayer designation of the brightest star in the southern circumpolar constellation of Reticulum, with an apparent visual magnitude of 3.3. This appears to be a solitary star located at a distance of 162 light-years from Earth. Although it is bright enough to be seen with the naked eye, the declination of this star means that it is best viewed from the southern hemisphere and is only readily visible below the tropic of cancer.

This star has more than three times the mass of the Sun and is about 330 million years old. The spectrum of this star matches a stellar classification of G8 II-III, with the luminosity class notation 'II-III' indicating it shows some traits of both a giant star and a bright giant.

Alpha Reticuli has a 12th-magnitude visual companion, CCDM J04144-6228B, at an angular separation of 48 arcseconds away along a position angle of 355°. Since the two stars share a common proper motion across the celestial sphere, it is possible that Alpha Reticuli, rather than being solitary, may instead be the primary component of a binary star system with an orbital period of, at least, 60,000 years.

Naming

References

G-type bright giants
M-type main-sequence stars
Binary stars
Reticulum (constellation)
Reticuli, Alpha
PD-62 00332
027256
019780
1336